Edward James Follows (November 30, 1926 – October 21, 2016) was a Canadian film, television and stage actor. He was best known for playing the role of Macduff in Macbeth at the Stratford Festival and the 1961 CBC Television film adaptation, and his television roles as the title character in the CBC drama series McQueen, as crown attorney Arnold Bateman in Wojeck, and as Charles Tupper, Minister of Railways, in The National Dream.

Early life and education 
Follows was born in Ottawa, Ontario in 1926 to Edward James Follows and Isabella (née Latimer) Follows, and had a younger brother, Jack. He was raised in a variety of locations across Canada as his father was a serviceman with the Royal Canadian Air Force. Ted Follows attended high school in Winnipeg. He studied psychology at the University of Toronto, also acting in Hart House theatre productions, and following his graduation he had his first professional acting role in 1945.

Career 
Over the next number of years, Follows regularly toured Canada and the United Kingdom with the Canadian Players and the Canadian Repertory Theatre Company, before being invited to join the Stratford company in 1955.

In 2001, Follows directed a production of Noël Coward's Hay Fever in Gravenhurst, with a cast that included himself, Greenhalgh, all of their children and their children's spouses. They subsequently mounted a tour of the production to several Southern Ontario cities in 2003.

Personal life 
He married actress Dawn Greenhalgh in 1958. The couple had four children, including actress Megan Follows, before divorcing in 1979. Follows later remarried to Susan Trethewey, a musician with the Stratford Festival Orchestra.

Filmography

Film

Television

References

External links

1926 births
2016 deaths
20th-century Canadian male actors
21st-century Canadian male actors
Canadian male television actors
Canadian male stage actors
Canadian male film actors
Canadian theatre directors
Male actors from Ottawa
Canadian male Shakespearean actors